The Tupolev Tu-155 is a modified Tupolev Tu-154 (СССР-85035) which was used as an alternative fuel testbed, and was the world's first experimental aircraft operating on hydrogen and later liquid natural gas. The similar Tu-156 was never built.

Design and development

The Tu-155 first flew on 15 April 1988. It used first liquid hydrogen and later liquified natural gas (LNG). It flew until the demise of the Soviet Union and it is currently stored at Ramenskoye Airport near Zhukovskiy. The Tu-156 was intended to fly circa 1997, but was cancelled due to the end of the Soviet Union. The aircraft used cryogenics to store fuel. The Tu-155 was a hybrid, only one of its three Kuznetsov NK-8 engines (they are now called NK-88) was actually powered by hydrogen. The fuel tank was located in the air-blown (or nitrogen) rear compartment. A distinctive feature of the aircraft is that the protrusion of the ventilation system is visible on the tail (near the no. 2 engine). The Tu-155 used Kuznetsov NK-88 engines. The Tu-156 was intended to use Kuznetsov NK-89 engines. The Tu-155 flew approximately 100 flights before it was placed in storage. However, only some flights were performed with hydrogen. From January 1989, Tupolev was mainly testing natural gas as a substitute for kerosene.

See also

References

External links

 Tu-155 hydrogen-powered aircraft details
 20 Years from the first flight of Tu-155
 Tu-155 aircraft details
 Tu-155 / Tu-156

Hydrogen-powered aircraft
1980s Soviet experimental aircraft
Tu-0154
Trijets
T-tail aircraft
Low-wing aircraft
Aircraft first flown in 1988